Tine Mulej (21 January 1921 – 9 April 1982) was a Slovenian alpine skier. He competed at the 1948 Winter Olympics and the 1952 Winter Olympics, representing Yugoslavia.

References

External links
 

1921 births
1982 deaths
Slovenian male alpine skiers
Olympic alpine skiers of Yugoslavia
Alpine skiers at the 1948 Winter Olympics
Alpine skiers at the 1952 Winter Olympics
People from the Municipality of Radovljica